Aleksandar Čanović (Serbian Cyrillic: Александар Чановић; born 18 February 1983) is a former Serbian professional footballer who played as a goalkeeper.

Club career
Čanović played for Voždovac (twice), Pobeda and Bregalnica Štip (in Macedonia), Vojvodina, BASK, Rad, BSK Borča (twice), Dinamo Minsk (in Belarus), Ermis Aradippou (in Cyprus), Birkirkara (in Malta), Jedinstvo Užice, and Cherno More Varna (in Bulgaria).

International career
Čanović was named in the Serbia and Montenegro squad for the 2004 Summer Olympics. He served as a backup to Nikola Milojević, failing to make any appearances in the tournament.

Honours
Pobeda
 Macedonian First Football League: 2003–04
Cherno More Varna
 Bulgarian Cup: 2014–15
 Bulgarian Supercup: 2015

External links
 Srbijafudbal profile
 
 
 

Association football goalkeepers
Belarusian Premier League players
Birkirkara F.C. players
First Professional Football League (Bulgaria) players
Cypriot First Division players
Ermis Aradippou FC players
Expatriate footballers in Belarus
Expatriate footballers in Bulgaria
Expatriate footballers in Cyprus
Expatriate footballers in Malta
Expatriate footballers in North Macedonia
FC Dinamo Minsk players
First League of Serbia and Montenegro players
FK BASK players
FK Bregalnica Štip players
FK BSK Borča players
FK Dinamo Pančevo players
FK Jedinstvo Užice players
FK Pobeda players
FK Rad players
FK Vojvodina players
FK Voždovac players
Footballers at the 2004 Summer Olympics
Kosovo Serbs
Macedonian First Football League players
Maltese Premier League players
Olympic footballers of Serbia and Montenegro
Sportspeople from Mitrovica, Kosovo
PFC Cherno More Varna players
Serbia and Montenegro footballers
Serbian expatriate footballers
Serbian expatriate sportspeople in Belarus
Serbian expatriate sportspeople in Bulgaria
Serbian expatriate sportspeople in Cyprus
Serbian expatriate sportspeople in Malta
Serbian expatriate sportspeople in North Macedonia
Serbian First League players
Serbian footballers
Serbian SuperLiga players
1983 births
Living people